The Association of Scottish Police Superintendents (ASPS), established in 1924, is a Scottish police staff association. It represents all police superintendents and chief superintendents in the country.

The association exists to liaise with police and legal authorities on service-related welfare issues, and to shape both policy and operational practice.

See also
Scottish Police Federation
Association of Chief Police Officers in Scotland

References

External links

Law enforcement in Scotland
Police unions
Trade unions in Scotland
1924 establishments in Scotland
Trade unions established in 1924